Japanese Court rituals  are rituals performed by the Emperor of Japan for the purpose of praying for the nation and its people's peace and prosperity. Rituals are held at the Tokyo Imperial Palace and the Three Palace Sanctuaries and include the 'Grand Service' in which the emperor himself performs the rituals and delivers the imperial proclamation, and the Minor Service in which the chief priests (shosokuji) and others perform the rituals and the emperor pays homage. The other is the Minor Festival in which the chief priests (shosoten-ji) conduct the ceremony and the emperor pays his respects.

History

Heian Period 

Since the establishment of the Ritsuryo system, the formalization of rituals has progressed, and is summarized in the Engishiki. This is a list of various rituals, and does not take the form of a list of court rituals alone.

Disasters such as Disease, Epidemic, Earthquake, Fire, and Natural disaster were thought to be caused by God's possession, and were compared to Oni or feared as a god of plague.

The Divinities Officer was in charge of the divinities rituals and was not under the jurisdiction of the Onmyodo dormitory. Various rituals are said to have been held, including the Plague God Festival, Chinka Festival, Wind God Festival, Great Purification, Miyagi Four Corners Plague God Festival, Fire Prevention Festival, and Hotarubetsu Festival.、Onmyodo-do was developed in sorcery style based on the aristocratic society of the Heian period, and included Onmyodo elements in the Shinto rituals of the Ritsuryo system.

The four corners of the capital were bounded (sacred and secular areas), and rituals were held at the four corners of the capital and the four corners of the Miyagi Castle to pray for the safety and peace of the world.
The Onmyōji Persecution by Toyotomi Hideyoshi began, driving Onmyōji who made their living as Prayers and Divinations to the provinces, and they quickly lost power, and people calling themselves Onmyōji, which was far greater than the number of official Onmyōji in OnmyōRituals at the palace took on a more Shinto coloring.ryō at the time, flowed throughout the country. During the Sengoku era Persecution, even the Tsuchimikado family lost many of their Onmyōdō traditions and ritual implements. The Altar of the Taizanfukunsai, the most important "Great Law" of Onmyōdō, was also lost, and the ritual instruments were borrowed from the Yoshida Shrine in Kyoto for the ground-breaking ceremony of the Imperial Palace. This had a significant impact on the Rituals at the palace took on a more Shinto coloring.。On the other hand, Onmyodo path was authorized by the Tokugawa shogunate, and was converted to Shinto by Yasufuku Tsuchimikado as Tensha Shinto under the influence of Taruka Shinto.

Before modern times 
As Emperor Juntoku of the Middle Ages stated in "Shinto ritual " in "Shinto ritual", the emperor has given "Shinto ritual" the highest priority since Hagoku. Four -way worship is an event that has been handed down to successive emperors since before the Edo period .

In the middle and late Edo period, there was a growing theory of sonnō based on Mitogaku , and the revival of rituals such as the Niiname -no-Matsuri became popular.

From the Meiji era to the prewar period 
Many of the rituals held today were reorganized during the Meiji Restoration , inheriting the Taiho Code , the Sadakan Ceremony , and the Engi Ceremony .

Along with the deification of the emperor as the " current god " and the separation of Shinto and Buddhism , the rituals that had been cut off were reconstructed and new rituals were created. In 1871 ( Meiji 4), a Daijo-kan's decree stating that "a shrine is a national ritual" was issued, and in 1908, the imperial ritual decree stipulating the  court ritual was enacted as one of the imperial decree .

Rice cultivation is carried out in the rice fields in Miyagi, and after Emperor ShowaHe began to plant rice . the harvested rice is used as an offering during rituals.

Postwar 
After the defeat of Japan in 1945, and under the postwar rule of the Allied Command, the Imperial Household Agency. The former Imperial Household Law, which had been separated from the national government, was abolished when the Constitution of Japan came into effect, and the fully revised Imperial Household Law became a general law.

In conjunction with this, the prewar Imperial Household Ordinances, such as the Imperial Rituals Ordinance, were all abolished at one time, but the Imperial Household Agency issued an internal circular confirming that "matters for which no new explicit provisions have been made shall be implemented in accordance with the former Imperial Household Ordinances.

Position under the Constitution of Japan 
There is no explicit provision for court rituals in the Constitution of Japan or its subordinate laws, and current court rituals are conducted in accordance with the Imperial Household Rituals Ordinance. The budget for this is also handled by the Imperial Household's internal expenses. For this reason, some constitutional scholars have interpreted postwar court rituals as "ceremonies performed privately by the emperor.

The official website of the Imperial Household Agency explains the  court ritual in the section "Public affairs of the Imperial Household Agency"。

In addition, Prime Minister and other heads of the three branches of government have been confirmed to attend some rituals, mainly the Grand Festival. Eisaku Sato attended most of the Spring Imperial Rei Festival and Spring Temple Festival, Autumn Imperial Rei Festival and Autumn Temple Festival, and the Shinmae Festival during his tenure as prime minister, and he also attended the NHK Special "The True Face of the Symbolic Emperors" (broadcast on April 10, 2009, a program commemorating the 50th anniversary of the marriage of the Emperor and Empress), showed footage of the then Prime Minister Taro Aso and other heads of the three powers attending the Spring Imperial Service and Spring Temple Service.

Since the establishment of the  court ritual as an institution, Emperor Meiji and Emperor Taisho were not very enthusiastic, and the chamberlains were the main worshipers. On the other hand, Empress Teimei , Emperor Showa , and Empress Kojun were very enthusiastic.

It can be seen from the diary that Sukemasa Irie , who was a samurai servant in the latter half of his reign , promoted the simplification of rituals due to the aging of Emperor Showa in the 1965s and 1950s . Until 1986), he continued the parent festival of Niiname-no-Matsuri.

The 125th Emperor Akihito and Empress Michiko were also extremely enthusiastic about the ritual, and except for the darkness (in mourning) and illness, they worshiped most of the  court rituals without making a substitute.

Regarding rituals, in addition to calling Kiyosai and Heian shōzoku in advance, it is necessary to sit upright for a long time, and when the ritual approaches, Emperor Showa consciously sits upright for a long time, such as watching TV in the seiza. It is said that he was keeping that in mind. It was said that Akihito was practicing seiza as well as Emperor Showa when the time of the Niiname-no-Matsuri approached, but after 2009 ( Heisei 21), 20 years after his reign, consideration for the health of elderly Akihito. In order to reduce the burden, simplification and adjustment of rituals were planned and implemented.

Rituals 
Those in bold are the major festivals.

 January 1 - Shiho hai (worship in the four directions), Saidansai (New Year's Day Festival)
 January 3 - New Year's Day Festival' (Genshi-Sai)
 January 4 - Soujihajime (Beginning of the Preparation for the New Year)
 January 7 - Emperor Showa Festival'
 January 30 - Emperor Komei's Festival
 February 17 - Kinnensai (Prayer Festival)
 February 23 - Tencho Festival
 Vernal Equinox Day - Spring Kōreisai, Spring Temple Festival
 April 3 - Jinmu-tennosai, OkinreidensaiGokagura
 June 16 - Empress Kōjun annual festival (Kōjun Kōgoreisai)
 June 30 - Yoori, Great Purification Ceremony
 July 30 - Emperor Meiji annual festival
 Autumnal Equinox Day - Autumnal Equinox Festival, Autumn Temple Festival
 October 17 - Kaname-sai, Kaname Festival
 November 23 - 'Niname Festival (Niinamesai)
 Mid-December - Kashikokoro Mikagura (Shrine of the Goddess of Mercy)
 December 25 - Taisho-tenno-sai (Emperor Taisho's Festival)
 December 31 - Setsubori, Grand Purification

Difference from the Imperial Ritual Decree 
 February 11 - Abolition of Kigen-setsu-sai.
 However, even after the abolition, the same rituals are still held as 'Temporary Gyohai'.
 The name was changed from Tencho-setsu festival to Tencho-sai.
 The Shiho-gyohyo, Kanade-jikki-hajime, Imperial Rei-den Gokagura, Setsue-ori, and Taisho (purification) are neither major nor minor festivals.

Dress 
Attendants are required to wear Morning coat and Afternoon dress in western style, and white-necked montsuki or similar in Japanese style. During the winter, cloaks may be worn.

Bibliography 

 高橋紘『象徴天皇』（岩波新書、1987年）
 原武史『昭和天皇』（岩波新書、2008年）
 八木秀次「宮中祭祀廃止論に反駁する｣（｢正論｣、2008年6月5日付） 
 NHKスペシャル「象徴天皇 素顔の記録」（NHK、2009年4月10日放送、のちDVD）

See also 

 Japanese Imperial Rituals
 Kyoto Imperial Palace

References

External links 

 宮中祭祀 宮内庁公式ページの宮中祭祀についての説明
 [ 平田久編『宮中儀式略』民友社、1904年。]
 鎌田純一『皇室祭祀と建国の心』
 原武史・保阪正康「宮中祭祀というブラックボックス」（講談社「MouRa」HP）
 天皇陛下 宮中祭祀 - NHK放送史

Shinto festivals
Japanese Imperial Rituals
Pages with unreviewed translations